Gary Lee Thomas (born 1962) is a retired United States Marine Corps four-star general. He was most recently the 35th Assistant Commandant of the Marine Corps. Gen Thomas is a naval aviator who flew the McDonnell Douglas F/A-18 Hornet and participated in combat operations during the Gulf War, the 2003 invasion of Iraq, and the War in Afghanistan. He has commanded at the squadron and Wing level and also lead Marine Corps aviation's weapons school. Thomas is a graduate of the University of Texas at Austin and National Defense University.

Biography

Early years
Thomas graduated from the University of Texas at Austin in 1984 and was commissioned in the united States Marine Corps as a Second Lieutenant.

Military career

LtCol Thomas took command of VMFA-323 on October 27, 2001 at Marine Corps Air Station Miramar.  The squadron deployed as the lone Marine fighter squadron onboard the USS Constellation (CV-64) in November 2002.  During this deployment the squadron supported combat operatioins during the 2003 invasion of Iraq.  Thomas turned over command of the squadron on June 13, 2003. Following his command tour he attended National Defense University and graduated with an M.S. in National Security Strategy in June 2004.

As a Colonel he commanded Marine Aviation Weapons and Tactics Squadron One (MAWTS-1).  As a Brigadier General he served as the Assistant Deputy Commandant for Aviation,  and later as the Assistant Wing Commander of the 2nd Marine Aircraft Wing  He was the Commanding General, 2d Marine Aircraft Wing (Forward) in Afghanistan from February to December 2013.  He later as the Commanding General, 2d Marine Aircraft Wing at Marine Corps Air Station Cherry Point, North Carolina.

On June 21, 2018, LtGen Thomas was nominated for appointment to the rank of General and to serve as the Assistant Commandant of the Marine Corps.  Thomas was the 35th Assistant Commandant of the Marine Corps.  On October 7, 2020, General Thomas tested positive for COVID-19 after attending a meeting of the Joint Chiefs of Staff at The Pentagon.

He retired from active duty at the end of his term as assistant commandant, with his retirement ceremony held on October 15, 2021.

Awards and decorations
Thomas' decorations and medals include:

References

External links
Official biography

2003 Interview from the Ap Archive

1962 births
United States Marine Corps personnel of the Gulf War
United States Marine Corps personnel of the War in Afghanistan (2001–2021)
Assistant Commandants of the United States Marine Corps
Living people
National Defense University alumni
People from Austin, Texas
Recipients of the Defense Superior Service Medal
Recipients of the Legion of Merit
Recipients of the Meritorious Service Medal (United States)
United States Marine Corps generals
United States Naval Aviators
University of Texas alumni
Military personnel from Texas